Philip Henry Mecom (1889–1969) was an American lawyer from Arcadia, Louisiana. He served as United States Attorney for the Western District of Louisiana under four presidents.

Childhood
Philip Henry Mecom was born on May 13, 1889, to William and Carol Mecom in Arcadia, Louisiana. He was the youngest of 11 siblings and was orphaned at the young age of 13 having two of his older brothers raise him from that point on. He would go on to be educated at Louisiana State University and Tulane Law School.

US Attorney
Philip and Virginia Mecom moved to Shreveport from New Orleans in 1921 when he was appointed assistant U.S. attorney for the Western District of Louisiana. The following year he moved up to become U.S. attorney, a position he held until 1935, when he resigned to resume his private law practice.

Cases
Known cases include:
United States v. Norvel
United States v. Hosier
United States v. Looney
Oden v. United States

References

1889 births
1969 deaths
20th-century American lawyers
Louisiana lawyers
Louisiana Republicans
Louisiana State University alumni
People from Arcadia, Louisiana
People from New Orleans
People from Shreveport, Louisiana
Tulane University Law School alumni
United States Attorneys for the Western District of Louisiana